Wrath of Ashardalon is a 2011 cooperative board game for 1 to 5 players published by Wizards of the Coast.

Overview
In Wrath of Ashardalon, a terrifying red dragon lurks deep within a monster-infested labyrinth maze, found inside a cave mouth. The game features multiple scenarios and challenging quests.

Contents
Wrath of Ashardalon includes 42 plastic heroes and monsters, 13 sheets of interlocking cardstock dungeon tiles, 200 encounter and treasure cards, a rulebook, a scenario book, and a 20-sided die.

Reception
Ben Kuchera of Penny Arcade called Wrath of Ashardalon "a good way to sneak in a quick dungeon crawl when a full Dungeons and Dragons session would take too long".

References

External links

Board games introduced in 2011
Dungeons & Dragons board games
Wizards of the Coast games